Eozenillia is a genus of parasitic flies in the family Tachinidae. There are at least three described species in Eozenillia.  The larvae of Eozenillia equatorialis are known to be parasitoids of Mahasena corbetti.

Species
These three species belong to the genus Eozenillia:
 Eozenillia equatorialis Townsend, 1926 
 Eozenillia psychidarum (Baranov, 1934)
 Eozenillia remota (Walker, 1853)

References

Further reading

 
 
 
 

Tachinidae
Articles created by Qbugbot